Bifrenaria venezuelana is a species of orchid.

venezuelana
Plants described in 1965